Kerner Optical was an American practical visual effects company based in San Rafael, California.

Originally the practical effects division of Industrial Light & Magic (ILM), it was spun off as an autonomous company in 2006. After five years of operating independently, Kerner declared bankruptcy and ceased operations in 2011.

History

Kerner's history dates to George Lucas's founding of Industrial Light and Magic. In the late 1970s, ILM moved to facilities in San Rafael, California, on Kerner Boulevard; the sign outside the building identified it as the Kerner Company. The company hid in plain sight and was known to locals, industry insiders, clients and suppliers as Kerner. George Lucas explained that the name Kerner was a "deception designed to keep kids from rummaging through garbage bins".

In 2006, the practical effects department was, like Pixar in 1986, spun off from Industrial Light & Magic. When George Lucas moved the computer graphics team to the Presidio of San Francisco in 2006, he sold five physical effects divisions of ILM in a management-led buyout that resulted in the creation of a new company that took on the name Kerner Optical as a tribute to the long history shared with ILM. Kerner continued to operate in the same property, in San Rafael, from which they had operated for over 30 years and the original "Kerner Co." sign is still displayed in front of the building.

In the three years since leaving the Lucasfilm family, Kerner continued to provide practical special effects to major film productions.

In addition to films, Kerner was selected in 2007 to build a three-dimensional scale model of the Disneyland Park in Anaheim, California for the Walt Disney Family Museum. Named the "Disneyland of Walt's Imagination," the model is displayed at Gallery 9 of the museum, which is located in the Presidio, not far from the extant ILM headquarters.

Kerner also continued several years of significant research and development in the areas of 3D camera rigs and consumer products. Kerner's creature shop manufactured lifelike, servo-controlled dummies with simulated injuries used for training military medics.

In August 2009, entrepreneur Eric Edmeades acquired a controlling interest in the business and became CEO of the group. In February 2011, Kerner filed for Chapter 11 bankruptcy protection in San Francisco. Despite record profitability during reorganization, investor and previous owner Kevin Duncan of Duncan Oil appealed to the courts to have Eric Edmeades replaced by a trustee, alleging mismanagement. Duncan was also an owner and member of the management team for each of the first three loss-making years during which the company incurred millions of dollars in debt. Duncan's petition forced the company to turn away at least two ILM contracts and ultimately, despite Edmeades having enough creditor votes to approve his reorganization plan, led to the closure of the company seven months after the original Chapter 11 filing. After refiling their bankruptcy under Chapter 7, the court ordered liquidation of their assets.

Milestones
As Kerner Optical
2006: Kerner's solutions shop, Kernerworks, developed specialized hidden cameras designed to look like rocks to help capture the footage for The Cove.
2009: Kerner completes a 2-year project to build a detailed model, the centerpiece of the Disney Museum, that shows Disney the way Walt Disney saw it.
2009: Kerner and Emily Carr University of Art and Design established a stereoscopic Center of Excellence for the development of education and training for stereopgraphers.
2010:Kerner Group under new CEO Edmeades plans restructuring to aim 3D production
2011: Filed for Chapter 11 Bankruptcy
2011: Closed business.
2011, October 21–27: Court-Ordered Liquidation Auctioning of equipment

Selected filmography (as Kerner Optical)

Kerner Optical worked on Transformers: Revenge of the Fallen, providing miniatures and pyrotechnics for the aircraft carrier crash, the bridge destruction, and various building collapse sequences, among others.

Kerner Optical worked on Terminator Salvation, providing miniatures and pyrotechnics for the Very Large Array, the dilapidated building collapse, various aircraft explosions, and Serena's Tower, among others.

Kerner Optical also worked on the J. J. Abrams film Star Trek and the Ashton Kutcher film Killers.

Trivia
Adam Savage, Grant Imahara and Tory Belleci of Mythbusters fame all worked for Industrial Light & Magic at Kerner's facility in San Rafael.

References

External links
"Tales from the Tank", video of Kerner Optical people at work on Pirates of the Caribbean.

2006 establishments in California
2011 disestablishments in California
American companies established in 2006
American companies disestablished in 2011
Companies based in San Rafael, California
Companies that have filed for Chapter 7 bankruptcy
Companies that filed for Chapter 11 bankruptcy in 2011
Entertainment companies based in California
Entertainment companies established in 2006
Entertainment companies disestablished in 2011
Lucasfilm
Special effects companies
Visual effects companies

de:Kerner
fr:Kerner